Dubus is a surname. Notable people with the surname include:

Alexis Dubus (born 1979), English comedian and actor
Andre Dubus (1936–1999), American writer
Andre Dubus III (born 1959), American writer
Éric Dubus (born 1966), French middle distance runner
Mathieu Dubus (c. 1590 – c. 1665), a Flemish-Dutch landscape painter